Christianity is the religion of 6% (~ 25,000) of the population of Djibouti (923,000 – July 2012 est.). Christians are mostly of Ethiopian and European ancestry. Most Christians are Ethiopian Orthodox or Roman Catholic. The constitution of Djibouti includes freedom of religion, although Islam is the state religion. There is a tolerant attitude between religions in general. Proselytizing by any faith in public is not allowed.

Christianity came into Djibouti during Aksumite rule seems to have included a substantially larger region, possibly the coast from present-day Sudan to Djibouti.

Christian denominations 
3.2% of the population are Orthodox. 0.07% to 1% of the population (about 4,767 persons) are Protestants. According to the World Christian Encyclopedia, among other denominations are the Eglise Protestante de Djibouti and the Greek Orthodox Church The Mennonite Mission is active in Djibouti. The Eglise Protestante Evangelique de Djibouti (known in English as the Protestant Church of Djibouti) was founded in 1960. It is active in the care for refugees, among other things.  There is a Djibouti Parish of the New Apostolic Church.

Djibouti is included in the Episcopal Area of the Horn of Africa of the Anglican Diocese of Egypt, though there are no current congregations in the country.

Roman Catholicism 

There are around 7,000 Catholics in Djibouti. The only Roman Catholic diocese there is the Diocese of Djibouti, divided into five parishes. Just over 1% to 2% of the population are members of the diocese. Djibouti maintains diplomatic relations with the Vatican.

See also
Islam in Djibouti
Roman Catholicism in Djibouti

References and notes

External links 
 US State Dept. Report on Religious Liberty in Djibouti